Julian I was the Patriarch of Antioch and head of the Syriac Orthodox Church from 591 until his death in 594/595. He is commemorated as a saint by the Syriac Orthodox Church.

Biography
Julian was born in the 6th century, and became a monk at the Monastery of Qenneshre, where he likely learnt Greek. He served as syncellus (secretary) to Patriarch Peter III, and was elected as his successor as patriarch in 591. It is suggested that Julian was opposed to the doctrine of tritheism, like the Patriarch Peter, and this may have influenced his election. He was consecrated by the bishop John of Tella. Julian served as patriarch until his death on 9 July 594/595.

Works
Julian wrote a commentary on the works of Patriarch Peter III, in which he clarified errors, and responded to misgivings regarding the works expressed by Sergius the Armenian, archbishop of Edessa, and his brother John.

References
Notes

Citations

Bibliography
Primary sources

Secondary sources

 

595 deaths
6th-century Syriac Orthodox Church bishops
Year of birth unknown
Syriac Patriarchs of Antioch from 512 to 1783
6th-century Oriental Orthodox archbishops
6th-century births
People of Roman Syria
6th-century Byzantine writers
Syriac Orthodox Church saints